Henry William "Chuck" Espy III (born April 24, 1975) is an American politician. Espy is Mayor of Clarksdale, Mississippi, elected June 2017. He also was a member of the Mississippi House of Representatives from 2000 to 2016.

Biography 
Chuck Espy served with distinction in the Mississippi House of Representatives for sixteen years. He was elected from District 26 in 1999 and created legislation that has impacted the lives of all people across the state.  
 
He has spoken on the House floor against Voter ID in the State of Mississippi. He also voted to protect retired teachers’ 13th check and to fully fund the Mississippi Adequate Education Program (MAEP). However, the legislation Espy is most proud of is the bill he co-authored in 2010 – the Children's Health Insurance Program (CHIP) – which gave health insurance to thousands of Mississippi children.  
 
Espy received his Bachelors of Science in Business Management from Southern University in Baton Rouge, LA. and received his Master's in Business Administration from Bethel University in McKenzie, TN.

Espy is president of Century Funeral Home and Burial Association, a family business that will celebrate 100 years of services this year.
 
To address economic inequities for families in crisis in his legislative district, Espy founded The Chuck Espy Foundation.  This endowment was supported by his legislative salary and matching donor contributions.  Espy has a strong spiritual faith and was baptized into the United Methodist Church as an infant.  He is a member of the NAACP, Omega Psi Phi fraternity. and a Prince Hall Mason.  As a member of the State Legislature, he served as Chairman of the Philanthropic Development Committee, Chairman of the Investigation of State Offices, and Chairman of the Foundation for Education and Economic Development (FEED), a charity organization founded by the Mississippi Legislative Black Caucus.

His father is former Clarksdale mayor Henry Espy and his uncle is former U.S. Secretary of Agriculture Mike Espy.

References

1975 births
Living people
African-American mayors in Mississippi
Democratic Party members of the Mississippi House of Representatives
21st-century American politicians